Meguertitch Khan Davidkhanian (1902-1983) was an Iranian general, politician, statesman, and a member of the Davidkhanian family.

Early life 
Meguertitch Khan Davidkhan, the son of General Sarkis Khan Davidkhanian, was born in Isfahan in 1902.

Career 
After fighting in the Turkish-Armenian War, as well as other subsequent wars as a soldier in the Iranian military, Meguertitch Khan played a leading role in the overthrow of Sheikh Khazal. 

In January 1925, after Sheikh Kazal had failed to receive support in his separatist uprising from not only the Bakhtiari, Lur and Khamseh tribes, but also the Qajar Dynasty and the British government, Reza Shah ordered one of his commanders, who knew Khazal well, to meet him and convince him to journey to Tehran. The commander, General Fazlollah Zahedi, accompanied by several government officials, met with Khazal and spent an evening with him on board his yacht, anchored in the Shatt al-Arab river by his palace in the village of Fallahiyah near the city of Mohammerah. That very evening, Reza Shah sent a gunboat of fifty troops, led by Meguertitch Khan Davidkhanian, to board the yacht. Meguertitch and his men arrested Khazal and took him by motorboat down the river to Mohammerah, where a car was waiting to take him to the military base in Ahvaz. This marked the end of the rebellion. Meguertitch Khan Davidkhanian was awarded the Order of Sepah by Reza Khan for his efforts. Meugertitch Khan was Governor of Khorramshahr circa 1927, and was appointed military Governor of Dezful during the Iran-Iraq War, serving as the local commander during Operation Nasr.

Family 
A member of the Davidkhanian family, Meguertitch's father was General Sarkis Khan Davidkhanian. He is related to Markar Davidkhanian, the former Minister of Finance of Iran, and Martiros Khan Davidkhanian, the former Chief of Staff of the Persian Cossack Brigade, among others.

References 

Iranian generals
Politicians from Isfahan
Iranian governors
Military personnel from Isfahan
People of Qajar Iran
Iranian people of Armenian descent
1902 births
1983 deaths